Walter Aussendorfer (18 April 1939 – 27 October 2019) was an Italian luger who competed during the early 1960s. He was born in Tiers. He won the bronze medal in the men's doubles event at the 1964 Winter Olympics in Innsbruck.

References

External links
 
profile on his own web page (with correct spelling in )
DatabaseOlympics.com information on Aussendorfer
Fuzilogik Sports - Winter Olympic results - Men's luge
Hickoksports.com results on luge and skeleton.

1939 births
2019 deaths
Italian male lugers
Olympic lugers of Italy
Lugers at the 1964 Winter Olympics
Olympic bronze medalists for Italy
Olympic medalists in luge
Medalists at the 1964 Winter Olympics
Germanophone Italian people
People from Tiers, South Tyrol
Sportspeople from Südtirol